"I Will Come to You" is a song by American pop rock band Hanson. It was released on November 10, 1997, as the third single from the band's debut album, Middle of Nowhere (1997). "I Will Come to You" reached number five on the UK Singles Chart and number nine on the US Billboard Hot 100. It was more successful in Australia, reaching number two and receiving a Platinum certification, and in Sweden, where it topped the chart for four weeks and was also certified Platinum.

Critical reception
British magazine Music Week gave "I Will Come to You" five out of five, picking it as Single of the Week. They added, "With its extremely catchy singalong chorus and big, dramatic build, this has huge Christmas hit written ail over it and could well upsel the bookies' predictions by going all the way to the top."

Music video
The accompanying music video for "I Will Come to You" was filmed in London. In the video Isaac, Taylor and Zac are performing in a forest. They look like angels in the city streets. There was also another video filmed at the Beacon Theatre in New York City; this version was directed by Jeb Brien.

Track listings

 US 7-inch single
A. "I Will Come to You" – 4:11
B. "With You in Your Dreams" – 3:53

 US CD and cassette single
 "I Will Come to You" – 4:11
 "Cried" – 3:34

 US maxi-CD single
 "I Will Come to You" (Tee's Frozen Club) – 7:47
 "I Will Come to You" (Tee's Radio) – 4:20
 "I Will Come to You" (Tee's Frozen Dub) – 7:29
 "I Will Come to You" (acapella) – 4:12
 "I Will Come to You" (album version) – 4:11
 "MMMBop" (live acoustic version) – 3:28

 UK and Australian CD1
 "I Will Come to You" – 4:11
 "Cried" – 3:34
 "MMMBop" (live) – 3:36
 "Madeline" (live) – 3:32

 UK and Australian CD2
 "I Will Come to You" – 4:11
 "MMMBop" (live) – 3:36
 "Merry Christmas Baby" – 3:08
 "What Christmas Means to Me" – 3:42

 UK cassette single and European CD single
 "I Will Come to You" – 4:11
 "MMMBop" (live) – 3:36

Charts

Weekly charts

Year-end charts

Certifications

Release history

References

1997 singles
1997 songs
Hanson (band) songs
Mercury Records singles
Number-one singles in Sweden
Songs with lyrics by Cynthia Weil
Songs written by Barry Mann
Songs written by Isaac Hanson
Songs written by Taylor Hanson
Songs written by Zac Hanson